Eupsophus calcaratus (common name: Chiloe Island ground frog) is a species of frog in the family Alsodidae.
It is endemic to Patagonia (southern Argentina and Chile). It has one of the broadest distributions of any Chilean frog.

Description
Head is wider than long and snout is rounded. Skin is only slightly granulated but has many spots and reticulated pattern. The colouration is highly variable, but it usually has a characteristic, hourglass-shaped pattern in its head.

The tadpoles develop in water-filled cavities on the ground. Males show parental care: they remain with the eggs and tadpoles. Tadpoles are endotrophic.

Habitat and conservation
Its natural habitat is humid Nothofagus temperate forest. It occurs in shady microhabitats (swamps and streams borders).

The species is common in appropriate habitats. Nevertheless, habitat loss and degradation due to deforestation is a major threat, and water pollution caused by forestry work is also a threat.

References

calcaratus
Amphibians of Argentina
Amphibians of Chile
Amphibians of Patagonia
Amphibians described in 1881
Taxa named by Albert Günther
Taxonomy articles created by Polbot